The J Award of 2008 is the fourth annual J Awards, established by the Australian Broadcasting Corporation's youth-focused radio station Triple J. The announcement comes at the culmination of Ausmusic Month (November). In 2008, a new award for Australian Music Video of the Year was added to the existing awards; Australian Album of the Year and Unearthed Artist of the Year. Robbie Ruck announced the winners on air on 5 December 2008.

Who's eligible? 
Any Australian album released independently or through a record company, or sent to Triple J in consideration for airplay, is eligible for the J Award. The 2008 nominations for Australian Album of the Year and Australian Music Video of the Year were selected from releases received by Triple J between December 2007 and November 2008. For Unearthed Artist of the Year it was open to any artist from the Unearthed (talent contest), who has had a ground breaking and impactful 12 months from November 2007 and October 2008.

Awards

Australian Album of the Year

Australian Video of the Year

Unearthed Artist of the Year

References

2008 in Australian music
2008 music awards
J Awards